Ryu Cheongung (Ryu Cheon-gung) or known as Senior Ryu was a rich-nobleman in the Later Three Kingdoms Period who became the father of Queen Sinhye and father in-law of Wang Geon, Goryeo dynasty's founder.

During Jinseong of Silla's reign, Ryu was a nobleman from Paseo region (along with Wang Ryung from Songak, Bak Ji-yun from Pyeongju, Hwangbo Je-gong from Hwangju, etc.) which later became "Jeongju Region" (정주, 貞州) and since he was a wealthy man who accumulated wealth through Commerce through the sea, the locals called him as "Senior" (장자, 長者). Although they independently against Gung Ye, they finally surrendered to him and Wang's son, Wang Geon, became Gung's general and took over the west coast (include Ganghwa Island. Ryu was said to treated Geon's army generously and made his daughter sleep with him, which this girl was the future Queen Sinhye. Ryu actively provided ship technology and knowledge acquired through maritime trade to Wang and Jeongju Port became an outpost where Wang became a naval general and built ships and trained naval forces to conquer Geumseong (Naju). Then, after the establishment of Goryeo dynasty, Ryu became Three Grand Masters (along with Bak Yeong-gyu and Hwangbo Je-gong) and had the most strong influence in the early Goryeo.

In popular culture
Portrayed by Kim Jin-hae in the 2000–2002 KBS1 TV series Taejo Wang Geon.
Portrayed by Kim Soo-il in the 2002–2003 KBS TV series The Dawn of the Empire.

See also
Who also held the title as Samjung Daegwang:
Bak Yeong-gyu
Hwangbo Je-gong

References

Year of birth unknown
Year of death unknown
10th-century Korean people
Silla people